The Mayor of Worcester is the civic head of Worcester City Council.

Every May one of the city Councillors is elected to serve as Mayor for a year. Another is elected as Deputy Mayor. The Mayor chairs meetings of the Full Council, represents the city at ceremonial occasions, welcomes international visitors and attends events organised by local people.

List of mayors of Worcester
Notable previous mayors
1623: John Haselock
1631: Thomas Chettle
1633: John Nash
1635: George Street
1646: Edward Elvines
1667: Thomas Street
1709: Richard Lane
1720: Joseph Weston (wine merchant) 
1819: Elias Isaac (banker) 
 1826: John Dent (Sheriff of Worcestershire, 1849)
1834: John Wheeley Lea (of Lea and Perrins)
1836-37 Christopher H. Hebb
1837-38 George Allies
1838-39 Richard Evans
1839-40 Thomas Chalk
1840-41 C. Augustus Helm
1841-42 Edward Evans
1842-43 John Lilly
1843-44 William Lewis
1845-46 Edward Lloyd (died)
1846 W. Lewis (elected)
1846-47 Fredk. Thos. Elgie
1847-48 Edward Webb
1848-49 Richard Padmore Worcester's first non-conformist mayor, later a Liberal Party MP.
1849-50 John Wheeley Lea
1850-51 W. S. P. Hughes
1851-52 Thomas Lucy
1852-53 Richard Padmore
1853-54 Charles Bedford
1854-55-6 John Goodwin
1856-57 James Weaver
1857-58 Josiah Stallard
1858-59 Thomas Rowley Hill later Liberal MP for Worcestershire.
1859-60 William Haigh
1860-61 Joseph Wood 
1861-62 Joseph Firkins
1862-63-4 Alexander Clunes Sheriff Chairman of Worcester Royal Porcelain Co. and later Liberal MP for Worcester.
1864-65 James Dyson Perrins
1865-66 Thomas Southall
1866-67 John Stallard
1867-68 William Webb
1868-69 Francis Woodward
1869-70 Richard E. Barnett
1870-71-2 Henry Willis
1872-73 Edward Wall (also Sheriff of Worcester)
1873-74 H. G. Goldingham
1874-75 John Longmore
1875-76 Francis Woodward
1876-77 Moses Jones
1877-78 Francis Dingle
1878-79 Walter Holland
1879-80 John Noake
1880-81 T. S. Townshend
1881-82 Lieut.-Col. Wm. Stallard
1882-83 Frederick Corbett
1883-84 W. B. Williamson
1884-85 Joseph S. Wood
1885-86 Ambrose Wm. Knott
1886-87 Walter Holland
1887-88 Herbert Caldicott 
1888-89 Ernest Augustus Day, architect and surveyor.
1889-90 R. Smith-Carrington
1890-91 W. R. Higgs
1891-92 Walter Holland
1892-93 Hon. Alfred Percy Allsopp, M.P.
1893-94 Geo. H. Williamson
1894-95 Hon. Alfred Percy Allsopp, M.P.
1895-96 Rt. Hon. William Lygon, 7th Earl Beauchamp, later Governor of New South Wales
1896-97 Charles William Dyson Perrins (of Lea and Perrins)
1897-98 Albert Buck
1898-99 John Alfred Steward
1899-1900 John Millington
1900-1 John Alfred steward
1901-2 Walter Holland
1902-3 Mr. C. J. Whitehead (Conservative)
1903-4 John Samuel Cook
1904-5 Hubert A. Leicester
1909–10: Alfred Percy Allsopp (third term)
1916–19: Arthur Carlton 
1922–23: Arthur Carlton 
1941–42: Richard Robert Fairbairn (died in office, October 1941)
1958–59: Harold Alfred Richards 

Recent mayors
Source
1999–2000: Josephine Hodges
2000–01: Mary Drinkwater
2001–02: David Clark
2002–03: Robert Rowden
2003–04: Gareth Jones
2004–05: Allah Ditta
2005–06: Aubrey Tarbuck
2006–07: Ian Imray
2007–08: Stephen Inman
2008–09: Lucy Hodgson
2009–10: Andy Roberts
2010–11: Mike Layland
2011–12: Dr David Tibbutt
2012–13: Roger Berry
2013–14: Pat Agar
2014–15: Alan Amos
2015–16: Roger Knight
2016–17: Paul Denham
2017–18: Steve Mackay
2018–19: Jabba Riaz
2019-20: Allah Ditta
2020-21: Josephine Hodges
2021-22: Stephen Hodgson
2022-23: Adrian Gregson

References

External links
 List of Mayors 1621–1651 and 1750–1775
  List of Mayors 1790–1817

Worcester, England
Lists of mayors of places in England
Mayors